Kadavulin Kuzhandhai is a 1960 Indian Tamil-language film directed by Dada Mirasi. The film stars Kalyan Kumar and Jamuna. It is based on the 1960 American film Nobody's Child.

Plot

Cast 
List adapted from the database of Film News Anandan and the film credits.

Male cast
Kalyan Kumar
M. R. Radha
T. K. Shanmugam
Nagesh
Javar Seetharaman
Pakkirisami
Kannan
S. S. Natarajan

Female cast
Jamuna
G. Sakunthala
Lakshmiprabha
Chitradevi
S. D. Subbulakshmi
Baby Mangalam
Baby Vijaya

Production 
The film was produced by Chinna Annamalai under the banner Vetrivel Films and was distributed by Shanmuga Pictures. Dada Mirasi directed the film. Cinematography was handled by M. Karnan while the editing was done by Jambulingam. Screenplay and dialogues were written by the producer Chinna Annamalai. Art direction was by Vardhoorkar. Thangaraj and Jayaraman were in charge of choreography. Still photography was done by R. Venkatachari.

Soundtrack 
The Music was composed by G. Ramanathan while the lyrics were penned by Namakkal Kavignar, Ku. Ma. Balasubramaniam, Namakkal R. Balu and K. D. Santhanam.

References

External links 

1960s Tamil-language films
Films scored by G. Ramanathan
Indian drama films